The 2022–23 KHL season is the 15th season of the Kontinental Hockey League. There were 22 teams that competed in the record-breaking 68 regular season games, beginning on 1 September 2022 and ended on 26 February 2023.

Season changes
For the 2022–23 season, the competition was reduced to 22 teams after Latvian club, Dinamo Riga, and Finnish club, Jokerit, withdrew from the competition during the previous 2021–22 playoffs due to the Russian invasion of Ukraine.

The regular season was expanded to feature 748 games scheduled for 164 gamedays, with each club to play a record-breaking 68 regular season engagements. The regular season was have just one international break, from 12-18 December 2022. That pause was preceded by the 2022 All-Star Week in Chelyabinsk on 10 and 11 of December.

Teams
The 22 teams are split into four divisions: the Bobrov Division and the Tarasov Division as part of the Western Conference, with the Kharlamov Division and the Chernyshev Division as part of the Eastern Conference.

Kunlun Red Star were the only team to be realigned, moving from the Kharalamov Division in the Eastern Conference to the Tarasov Division in the Western Conference.

League standings
Each team played 68 games: played every other team home-and-away (42 games), plus an additional 20 intra-conference games (10 home and 10 away games). The remaining 6 games were slated against opposition selected with a view to increasing the number of high-profile match-ups (3 home, 3 on the road). Points were awarded for each game, where two points were awarded for all victories, regardless of whether it was in regulation time, in overtime or after game-winning shots. One point was awarded for losing in overtime or game-winning shots, and zero points for losing in regulation time.

Western Conference

Eastern Conference

Continental Cup

Gagarin Cup playoffs
The Gagarin Cup playoffs started on 1 March 2023.

Bracket                                                                              

Pairings within the conferences are re-seeded after the conference quarterfinals
During the Gagarin Cup Finals the team that finished with higher seed in their conference has home ice (if both teams finished with the same seed the team that earned most points during the regular season has home ice)
updated as of match(es) played on 19 March 2023 UTC
source: KHL

Statistics

Scoring leaders

The following players led the league in points, at the conclusion of the regular season. If two or more skaters are tied (i.e. same number of points, goals and played games), all of the tied skaters are shown.

References

External links
 

Kontinental Hockey League seasons
KHL
2022–23 in Russian ice hockey